The Cougar C01, and its deriative, the Cougar C01B, were Group C sports car prototype race cars, designed, developed, and built by French constructor Cougar in 1984, and was used in sports car racing from 1982 to 1984. Its best result in the World Sportscar Championship sports car racing series was a tenth-place finish 1983 1000 km of Mugello, being driven by Yves Courage, Aldo Bertuzzi, and Gianni Giudici.

Development history and technology
The Cougar C01 is a closed Group C prototype, was developed and built by Yves Courage in 1985, prepared for the respective races by his own racing team, Cougar, and was the first sports prototype made by the company. It was powered by a Formula One-derived  naturally aspirated Ford-Cosworth DFL V8 engine, producing a respectable  @ 9,500 rpm. This drives the rear wheels through a 5-speed manual transmission.

References

Le Mans Prototypes
24 Hours of Le Mans race cars
Rear-wheel-drive vehicles
Mid-engined cars
Sports prototypes
Cars introduced in 1982
C01
Group C